Peddy is a surname. Notable people with the surname include:

 Arthur Peddy (1916–2002), American comic book and advertising artist
 George Peddy (1892–1951), American attorney, military officer, and political figure
 Giles Peddy (born 1978), English cricket player
 Shey Peddy (born 1988), American basketball player